Ravindu is a Sri Lankan male given name.

Notable people with this name include:
 Ravindu Shah, Kenyan cricketer
 Ravindu Kodituwakku, Sri Lankan cricketer
 Ravindu Laksiri, Sri Lankan squash player
 Ravindu Sembukuttige, Sri Lankan cricketer
 Ravindu Tillakaratne, Sri Lankan cricketer

Sinhalese masculine given names